Virginia Dell Blythe Clinton Dwire Kelley (née Cassidy; June 6, 1923 – January 6, 1994) was an American nurse anesthetist and the mother of Bill Clinton, the 42nd president of the United States.

Early life
Virginia Dell Cassidy was born in Bodcaw, Arkansas. She was the only child of James Eldridge Cassidy (1898–1957), the town iceman (later a grocer), and Edith (née Grisham) Cassidy (1901–1968), a nurse. Her family moved to Hope, Arkansas, when she was a toddler. During her high school years, she worked as a waitress at a local restaurant. Following her graduation from high school, Virginia moved to Shreveport, Louisiana, to study to be a nurse like her mother. During her training in Shreveport, she met her first husband, William Jefferson Blythe, Jr., whom she married in a civil ceremony in 1943, just before he shipped out for World War II military duty. Upon completion of her training, she returned to Hope, Arkansas. When her husband was discharged after the war, he picked her up and they moved for four months to Chicago, Illinois.

She moved back to her parents' house while she and William were in the process of getting a new home in the Hope area. While William was on his way back to Hope, he was killed in an automobile accident, three months before the birth of their son, Bill III. Virginia later spent time in New Orleans training to be a nurse anesthetist. In 1950, Virginia married car salesman Roger Clinton Sr., the father of the second of her two boys. Roger Clinton Sr. was an alcoholic and was physically and mentally abusive to Virginia and her boys. He did not adopt Bill, but Bill took his surname legally in 1962. He told his mother that it would be easier if they all had the same last name. Roger Sr. and Virginia divorced in 1962 but remarried each other a few months later.

Last years
Following Roger's death from cancer in 1967, Virginia Clinton married hairdresser Jeff Dwire in 1969; he subsequently died of complications of diabetes in 1974. On January 17, 1982, she married Richard Kelley (1915–2007), an executive at a food distribution brokerage firm. Their marriage lasted until her death on January 6, 1994, from complications of breast cancer, at the age of 70, at her home in Hot Springs, Arkansas. She died just under a year after her son became the 42nd president of the United States on January 20, 1993. She is buried alongside her first husband William J. Blythe at Rose Hill Cemetery in Hope, Arkansas.

Before her death, she was interviewed by Connie Chung and spoke about both of her sons.

In 1998, Bill Clinton recounted that his mother, along with his wife and John Lewis, was one of the earliest supporters for his initial presidential campaign.

References

 Clinton, Bill My Life, Knopf (June 22, 2004); 

External links
 Autobiography at Amazon.com
 Washington Post Obituary
 
 Virginia Clinton Kelley Breast Cancer fund
 Virginia Clinton Kelley at Findagrave.com

1923 births
1994 deaths
American nurses
American women nurses
Advanced practice registered nurses
Baptists from Louisiana
Burials in Arkansas
Deaths from cancer in Arkansas
People from Nevada County, Arkansas
People from Hope, Arkansas
People from Hot Springs, Arkansas
Deaths from breast cancer
Family of Bill and Hillary Clinton
Mothers of presidents of the United States
Northwestern State University alumni
People from Shreveport, Louisiana
Baptists from Arkansas
20th-century Baptists
20th-century American women